Houston Oldham (born October 20, 1990) is an American retired professional soccer player who played for Richmond Kickers in the United Soccer League.

College
Oldham played college soccer at the University of Richmond starting in 2009.

Professional
Oldham signed with United Soccer League side Richmond Kickers in June 2015.

References

External links 
 Richmond Spiders profile

1990 births
Living people
American soccer players
Richmond Spiders men's soccer players
Richmond Kickers players
Association football midfielders
Soccer players from Tennessee
USL Championship players